Björn Mehnert (born 24 August 1976) is a German football manager and a former player who played as a defender or midfielder.

Career
Mehnert began his career with his hometown club, Borussia Dortmund, and progressed through the reserve team, being promoted to the first-team squad of the then-European champions in 1997. He made his debut in the second leg of the UEFA Super Cup against Barcelona, replacing Steffen Freund as a 20th-minute substitute, and made three appearances in the Bundesliga, and one in the Champions League, against Sparta Prague.

Mehnert left Dortmund at the end of the 1997–98 season, joining ambitious Regionalliga side LR Ahlen, but returned six months later for another couple of seasons in Dortmund's reserve team. In 2002, he signed for Wuppertaler SV, where he spent four and a half seasons, leaving in January 2007 to join Preußen Münster. Six months later he returned to Wuppertal to play for the reserve team, before joining amateur side Westfalia Rhynern. In 2010, he was appointed as player-manager of SV Hohenlimburg, before returning to manage Rhynern a year later, having retired. He also works for VfL Osnabrück, in the capacity of sports marketing and video analysis.

References

External links

1976 births
Living people
German footballers
Association football defenders
Association football midfielders
Borussia Dortmund II players
Borussia Dortmund players
Rot Weiss Ahlen players
Wuppertaler SV players
SC Preußen Münster players
Bundesliga players
German football managers
Rot Weiss Ahlen managers
Footballers from Dortmund